Grand Bay is a parliamentary electoral district in Dominica. It includes the areas of Grand Bay, Bordieux and Montine. It came into effect in time for the 1975 Dominican general election. It has been represented by Edward Registe of the Dominica Labour Party since the 2019 general election.

Constituency profile 
The constituency was established prior to the 1975 Dominican general election. There was an electorate of 3,934 . It includes the areas of Grand Bay, Bordieux and Montine. The boundary extends from the western border of Saint Patrick Parish, from Soufriere Ridge to Micham River, along Geneva River to the sea.

Representatives 
This constituency has elected the following members of the House of Assembly of Dominica:

Election results

Elections in the 2010s

References 

Constituencies of Dominica